The Pasadena Convention Center is a convention center in Pasadena, California. It consists of three buildings.

Pasadena Civic Auditorium
The Civic Auditorium, one of the major structures in the Pasadena Civic Center District, was built in 1931 and is best known for being the home for the Emmy Awards from 1977 until 1997. It was designed by architects George Edwin Bergstrom, Cyril Bennett, and Fitch Haskell. Today, the Auditorium is home to the People's Choice Awards and the former home of the Pasadena Symphony Orchestra. It has also been used for some episodes of American Idol. It was used as the show's venue for "Hollywood Week" in season 10. The 3,029-seat theater hosts musicals, operas and concerts, among other events, on its  stage.

The venue's theatre organ was acquired in 1979, having been commissioned from American firm M. P. Möller in 1938 as a touring organ by Englishman Reginald Foort, who attended its Pasadena inauguration on April 23, 1980. It had been used by the BBC during and after World War II.

The auditorium was famously the site of some of the earliest live performances of Van Halen before being discovered.

The Motown 25: Yesterday, Today, Forever special was taped here on March 25, 1983; and aired on NBC in May. The show is best remembered for Michael Jackson's performance of "Billie Jean" in which he debuted his signature dance move the "Moonwalk". Louis Armstrong's 1951 album Satchmo at Pasadena was also recorded here.

The annual NAACP Image Awards have been held at the Auditorium numerous times, including at least (earlier records are incomplete) 1992–2000, 2014–2018, and 2020–2023, excluding 1995 (no awards presented), 2021 and 2022 (virtual due to the COVID-19 pandemic).

The auditorium has also been used for the Miss Teen USA 2007 pageant. The preliminary and final competitions were broadcast live on NBC.

From 2017 to 2019, the Auditorium hosted the 44th, 45th, and 46th Daytime Emmy Awards alongside their related 44th, 45th and 46th Daytime Creative Arts Emmy Awards.

The auditorium has hosted the America's Got Talent audition rounds since season 11 (2016). It also serves as the main venue for the live shows starting on season 17 (2022).

The auditorium hosts the annual Pasadena Unified School District graduation ceremonies for Blair High School, John Marshall Fundamental Secondary School, John Muir High School and Pasadena High School, which takes place after the Memorial Day holiday, since 2011.

Exhibition Building
The Exhibition Building, adjacent to the west side of the Auditorium, features  of exhibit space and can seat up to 4,400 for various events. Adjacent to the Exhibition Building is a  annex seating up to 600 patrons.

Conference Building
The Conference Building, adjacent to the south side of the Auditorium, has 20 meeting rooms totaling .

See also
List of convention centers in the United States

References

External links 
 Pasadena Convention Center
 The Pasadena Civic Auditorium

Convention centers in California
Concert halls in California
Buildings and structures in Pasadena, California
Tourist attractions in Pasadena, California
Multi-purpose stadiums in the United States
Public venues with a theatre organ